Silhouetta is a monotypic genus of hydrozoans belonging to the family Bougainvilliidae. The only species is Silhouetta uvacarpa.

The species is found in the coasts of Africa.

References

Bougainvilliidae
Hydrozoan genera
Monotypic cnidarian genera